Levan Berianidze (born 10 October 1990 in Tbilisi) is a Georgian-Armenian male freestyle wrestler. He won a bronze medal for Georgia at the 2010 World Wrestling Championships in Moscow. On 26 November 2014, Berianidze was given Armenian citizenship and freed from service in Armenian army. Berianidze competed for Armenia at the 2016 Summer Olympics in Rio.

References

External links
 

1990 births
Living people
Male sport wrestlers from Georgia (country)
Armenian male sport wrestlers
European Games competitors for Armenia
Wrestlers at the 2015 European Games
Olympic wrestlers of Armenia
Wrestlers at the 2016 Summer Olympics
World Wrestling Championships medalists
European Wrestling Championships medalists